2′-Fucosyllactose (2′-FL) is an oligosaccharide, more precisely, fucosylated, neutral trisaccharide composed of L-fucose, D-galactose, and D-glucose units. It is the most prevalent human milk oligosaccharide (HMO) naturally present in human breast milk, making up about 30% of all of HMOs. It was first discovered in the 1950s in human milk. The oligosaccharide's primary isolation technique has been in use since 1972.

Production
This compound may be biosynthesized in quantity using E. coli.

Metabolism

Uses
As with other oligosaccharides, a widely regarded characteristic of 2'-fucosyllactose is its ability to protect against infectious diseases namely in preventing epithelial level adhesions of toxins and pathogens.  The 2FL stimulates the growth of certain bifidobacteria and receptor analogons which lends to toxic and pathogenic protection, all this being most prevalent in infants.  Among the pathogens that 2FL is known to protect against are Campylobacter jejuni, Salmonella enterica serotype Typhimurium, Helicobacter pylori, among others.

References

Oligosaccharides